The bills of the 116th United States Congress list includes proposed federal laws that were introduced in the 116th United States Congress. This Congress began on January 3, 2019.

The United States Congress is the bicameral legislature of the federal government of the United States consisting of two houses: the lower house known as the House of Representatives and the upper house known as the Senate. The House and Senate are equal partners in the legislative process—legislation cannot be enacted without the consent of both chambers.

Once a bill is approved by one house, it is sent to the other which may pass, reject, or amend it. For the bill to become law, both houses must agree to identical versions of the bill. After passage by both houses, a bill is enrolled and sent to the president for signature or veto.  Bills from the 116th Congress that have successfully completed this process become public laws, listed as Acts of the 116th United States Congress.

Introduced in the House of Representatives

Passed by both houses, vetoed by Trump

Passed by the House, waiting in the Senate

Other legislation

Introduced in the Senate

Passed both houses, vetoed by Trump

Other legislation

See also
 List of acts of the 116th United States Congress
 Procedures of the U.S. Congress
 List of United States federal legislation

References

External links
Congress' Legislation Website
Govtrack.us – tracks Congressional activities
Library of Congress' legislation site 

 
Lists of United States legislation